Gillian Docherty  is a British computer scientist and CEO of The Data Lab and Chair of Scotland's AI Alliance, which helps Scottish industry innovate through data science and artificial intelligence.  Gillian promotes the use of Data to drive economic, societal and environmental benefits. She was appointed the first Chair of Scotland's AI Alliance in 2021, created to implement the activities of Scotland's AI Strategy,

Education 
Docherty completed a computer science degree at the University of Glasgow.

Docherty has been awarded an honorary doctorate in technology from Robert Gordon University.

Career 
Docherty joined IBM in 1993. She spent 22 years at IBM, working in technical sales, financial services, hardware and software. She was a UK senior executive and led the team responsible for driving IBM software propositions to Scottish clients.

Docherty became CEO of The Data Lab in June 2015. The Data Lab was established in 2014, and has since completed over 100 data science projects in Scotland, earning the economy more than £100 million. In March 2017 Docherty was described as one of The Scotsman's most influential women in technology. In 2015 she launched The Data Lab's MSc programme. She believes that Scotland will become a world-leading destination for data science. In 2016 she doubled the cohort of Data Lab sponsored Master course spaces to meet the rising demand in big data. The Data Lab has hubs in Aberdeen, Inverness, Edinburgh and Glasgow. It has received funding of over £25m in funding from Scottish Funding Council, Scottish Government, Scottish Enterprise and HIghland and Island's Enterprise.

In June 2017 she delivered a TEDx talk '"2037 - Who's leading? Who's following?". She won the 2017 CEO Of The Year at the ScotlandIS Digital Technology Awards. She is Deputy President of Glasgow Chamber of Commerce. In 2017 she was listed in the top 10 most influential data professionals in the UK. She has spoken at many events over the last few years including the Big Data Analytics conference and the Glasgow Business Summit.

Docherty was appointed Officer of the Order of the British Empire (OBE) in the 2019 Birthday Honours for services to information technology and business.

Personal 
Docherty is married with a daughter who appeared on stage with her during her TEDx talk.

References 

British computer specialists
British computer scientists
British computer programmers
Scottish computer scientists
Alumni of the University of Glasgow
British women chief executives
Year of birth missing (living people)
British women computer scientists
Living people
Officers of the Order of the British Empire